Baghajatin is a locality of South Kolkata in West Bengal, India.  It has been named in honour of Jatindranath Mukherjee whose nom de guerre was Bagha (Tiger) Jatin. It is located in the southern part of the city and is surrounded by Jadavpur and Santoshpur in the north, Chak Garia and Panchasayar in the east, Baishnabghata Patuli Township in the south and Bijoygarh and Regent Estate in the west.
The locality is referred to as the middle-class and currently growing very well-off, upper-middle-class people's locality in South Kolkata. Though it is surrounded by its rich and famous areas, over the it still remains primarily a nice upper-middle-class neighbourhood. Apart from its critical location in south Calcutta, it is also a place inhabited by prominent people with strong social and cultural background.
The two most important landmarks that signify this locality are Baghajatin railway station, Baghajatin bus terminal and EM Bypass which are the lifeline of this locality and its USP.

Educational institutions

 Pranta Pally Boys' And Girls' Schools
 Baghajatin Higher Secondary School For Boys
 Baghajatin Higher Secondary School For Girls
 Baghajatin Sammilita Higher Secondary School for Girls
 South Pioneer Academy
 Kidzee Pre-school & Teacher's Training Institute

Hospitals
 Baghajatin State General Hospital
 IRIS Hospital
 Peerless Hospital
 Apex Nursing Home
 Angel Nursing Home
 Dr Sinha  Nursing Home

WBTC Bus Routes

AC Bus
AC5 Garia Bus Stand – Howrah Station

Non AC Bus
S5 Garia Bus Stand – Howrah Station
KB17 Sonarpur -Salt Lake Karunamoyee
17B Baghajatin - Howrah Station
45 Patuli -Birati
45A Patuli -Airport
45B Garia railway station -Beleghata
13C Layelka - Old Dakghar
S5N Garia - Nabanna
Baishnabghata - Howrah Maidan mini
Ramgarh(Patuli) - BBD Bag.

Public Bus Routes
13C Baghajatin - Old Dakghar
17B Baghajatin - Howrah Station
45 Baishnabghata Patuli - Kolkata Airport Gate No.1
45B Garia Railway Station - Beliaghata Building More
80B Garia Bus stand - Esplanade
218 Baruipur - Babughat
KB17 Harinavi – Salt Lake Karunamoyee

Mini Bus
101 Garia Bus stand – B.B.D. Bagh
102 Patuli – B.B.D. Bagh
135 Baishnabghata - Howrah Maidan
M8/1 Sonarpur railway station – Khanna

Places of interest
 Big Bazaar, Metropolis Mall Hiland Park and Ganguly Bagan
 Patuli Floating market
 Rabindra pally
 Ramthakur Ashram

See also
 Dhakuria
 Jadavpur

References

Kolkata
West Bengal